Brantford railway station in Brantford, Ontario, Canada is a railway station serving Via Rail trains running between Toronto and Windsor.  The station also serves the nearby towns of Paris and Simcoe.

History

The station was built by the Grand Trunk Railway, as designed by architects Spier and Rohns, in 1905.

The station played a key role in Brantford's economic development. It brought markets, materials and labour into the city. Refurbishments for the Brantford railway station came in 2002 when Via Rail spent $350,000 ($ in today's money) to make general improvements to railway service. Ten passenger trains connect Brantford to the major economic hubs of Windsor, Sarnia, Toronto, Montreal, and Ottawa every day.

In 2011, GO Transit indicated in its "GO 2020" plan that peak hour train or bus service could be expanded to Brantford by the year 2020.

Facilities
The station is wheelchair-accessible and is located near the junction of Market, Gray and West Streets. CN Gore Park is the closest park to the railway station, with the Carnegie Library and the Brethour House being other attractions within a reasonable distance of the station. A self-service ticketing kiosk allows people to print out their own tickets.

The station building includes the Brantford Station Gallery, an art gallery & coffee shop featuring live music, which is open to travellers.

Brantford Transit provides transit access to and from the railway station. Short-term and long-term automobile parking are available for a fee as of August 1, 2012; previously the parking had been free to use. Increased use of railway services has been the primary reason for this change in parking policy.

See also

 List of designated heritage railway stations of Canada

References

External links

Via Rail: Brantford Railway Station

1905 establishments in Ontario
Buildings and structures in Brantford
Rail transport in Brantford
Passenger rail transport in Brantford
Via Rail stations in Ontario
Railway stations in Canada opened in 1905
Canadian National Railway stations in Ontario
Designated heritage railway stations in Ontario